José Guillermo Rivera Escobar (born November 25, 1969) is a retired Salvadoran professional football player.

Club career
Nicknamed Memo, Rivera came through the youth ranks at FAS, where he would stay for over a decade and win two league titles. In 1999, he moved abroad for a stint at Guatemalan side USAC. He returned to El Salvador to play for Salvadoran second division side  Isidro Metapán alongside fellow international William Renderos Iraheta and finished his career at Once Lobos.

International career
Rivera made his debut for El Salvador in 1988 and has earned a total of 74 caps, scoring 15 goals. He has represented his country in 22 FIFA World Cup qualification matches and played at the 1991, 1993, 1995 and 1999 UNCAF Nations Cups and was a non-playing squad member at the 1996 CONCACAF Gold Cup but did play at the 1998 CONCACAF Gold Cup.

His final international game was an August 2000 FIFA World Cup qualification match against Jamaica.

International goals
Scores and results list El Salvador's goal tally first.

Personal life
Rivera is married and has two children.

References

External links
 

1971 births
Living people
People from Cuscatlán Department
Association football midfielders
Salvadoran footballers
El Salvador international footballers
1996 CONCACAF Gold Cup players
1998 CONCACAF Gold Cup players
C.D. FAS footballers
Universidad de San Carlos players
A.D. Isidro Metapán footballers
Salvadoran expatriate footballers
Expatriate footballers in Guatemala
Salvadoran football managers